The Truyère  is a  river in south-western France, right tributary of the Lot. Its source is in the south-western Massif Central, north of Mende. It flows generally west through the following départements and towns:

 Lozère: Le Malzieu-Ville
 Cantal
 Aveyron: Entraygues-sur-Truyère

The Truyère flows into the Lot in Entraygues-sur-Truyère. Its main tributaries are the Bès near Albaret-le-Comtal, the Goul near Saint-Hippolyte and the Selves near Campouriez.

The Truyère feeds several reservoirs, like the Lac de Grandval and the Lac de Barrage de Sarrans, to supply hydroelectricity.

The Garabit Viaduct, built by Gustave Eiffel, spans the Truyère near Ruynes-en-Margeride.

References

Rivers of France
Rivers of Aveyron
Rivers of Cantal
Rivers of Lozère
Rivers of Auvergne-Rhône-Alpes
Rivers of Occitania (administrative region)